Palm Kingdoms is a turn-based strategy video game series developed by iosoftware LTD. This series is also formerly known as Pocket Heroes and Palm Heroes. The gameplay is reminiscent of the Heroes of Might and Magic series. Being started as a Pocket PC clone of Heroes of Might and Magic II, Palm Kingdoms became an independent project with its own graphics and gameplay.

Titles 
The original version was developed by Robert Tarasov and Anton Stuk. The first public alpha was debuted for Windows Mobile under the title "Pocket Heroes" in 2006. In 2007, the name changed to "Palm Heroes", because the original name was interloping with another trademark registered by a toy company. Finally, in 2012, the project was rebranded to its current name "Palm Kingdoms".

Gameplay 
The series' gameplay, starting from Pocket Heroes, had been copied from Heroes of Might and Magic II. The player controls a number of "heroes" which explore the map. The heroes also incorporate some role-playing game elements; they possess a set of statistics that confer bonuses to an army, artifacts that enhance their powers, and knowledge of magical spells that can be used to attack enemies or produce strategic benefits. Also, heroes gain experience levels from battle, and more experienced heroes are much more powerful than inexperienced ones. During the journey heroes can visit different buildings, collect treasures, conquer mines, etc.

Development

Reception 
The series had been received well by critics. They praised the quality of remaking Heroes of Might and Magic II gameplay as well as graphics, on the other hand, the lack of campaign mode had been criticized. In the review of Pocket Heroes for Pocket PC TamsPPC commented that the variety of terrain types and buildings looks very good and called it "one of the best games" the reviewer had ever seen on the mobile computer. In their review of Palm Heroes TouchMyApps described it as "the famous Heroes of Might & Magic in the palm of your hand (hence the name)" and noted that the game could be difficult to master for the casual gamer, but "anyone who invests the time to understand its mechanics will be rewarded by literally hundreds of hours of gameplay", but there were complains about the absent campaign mode and help section, also, the tutorial map had been found to be too difficult to notice. My Today Screen described the game as "absolutely tremendous", but expressed expectation on upgrading the map navigation and economic aspect of the game. Touch Arcade awarded Palm Heroes 2 4/5 score and stated that "the only complaint I have is the lack of a cohesive campaign mode". The reviewer commended the hot-seat multiplayer (through he was disappointed with the lack of online multiplayer), controls, and called it "one of the better strategy titles on the App Store". He also recommended to download the Deluxe version of this game. Palm Kingdoms, like Palm Heroes, had been enjoyed by TouchMyApps reviewer. The praise was offered to the redesigned interface, which had become "much much more intuitive", through "the interface is still not completely there in some respects". The iPhone App Review gave Palm Heroes 2 Deluxe 5 stars of 5, noting that the game offers "a phenomenal amount of depth for an iPad app".

References

External links 
 Official Website

Windows games
Windows Phone games
Windows Mobile games
Android (operating system) games
IOS games
MacOS games
Linux games
Video game franchises
Turn-based strategy video games
Video games developed in Bulgaria